Arzang may refer to:

 Arzhang, a Manichaean holy book
 Arzang, Iran, a village in East Azerbaijan Province, Iran